Diego Estrada may refer to:

Diego Estrada (runner) (born 1989), Mexican-American Olympic long-distance runner
Diego Estrada (footballer) (born 1989), Costa Rican footballer